The Lawn is a cricket ground in Waringstown, County Down, Northern Ireland.

History
The ground was established in 1851 on land donated by Thomas Waring, with Waringstown Cricket Club being founded in the same year. The ground is thought to be the second oldest in Ulster and is considered the Home of Ulster Cricket. The Lawn is known for its famous slanting outfield. Major cricket was first played at the ground in 2005, when Bermuda played the United States in a List A match as part of the 2005 ICC Trophy. A second List A match was held at the ground between Northern Knights and North West Warriors in the 2017 Inter-Provincial Cup.

Records

List A
 Highest team total: 311/8 by Bermuda v United States, 2005
 Lowest team total: 167 by Northern Knights v North West Warriors, 2017
 Highest individual innings: 132 by Janeiro Tucker for Bermuda v United States, 2005
 Best bowling in an innings: 4-39 by Dwayne Leverock, as above

See also
List of Northern Knights grounds
List of cricket grounds in Ireland

Notes and references

External links
The Lawn, Waringstown at CricketArchive

Cricket grounds in Northern Ireland
Sports venues in County Down
Sports venues completed in 1851
1851 establishments in Ireland